Wash Creek is a stream in Henderson County, North Carolina, in the United States.

Wash Creek may have been named from the fact women washed their laundry in it, according to local history.

See also
List of rivers of North Carolina

References

Rivers of Henderson County, North Carolina
Rivers of North Carolina